Crvarevac is a village located in the northwestern part of Bosnia and Herzegovina. It is about an hour away from Velika Kladuša and borders Zborište, municipality of Velika Kladuša, Čaglica, Varoška Rijeka and Bužim. The mayor of Velika Kladuša, Admil Mulalić, grew up in this village.

Demographics 
According to the 2013 census, its population was 691.

References

Populated places in Velika Kladuša